Godfather's Pizza is an American privately owned restaurant chain headquartered in Omaha, Nebraska, that operates fast casual Italian franchises and Pizza Express locations.

History
Godfather's Pizza was founded in Omaha, Nebraska, in 1973. Willy Theisen bought out the pizza parlor and the name in 1974 from Gregg Johnson (who later started the Minsky's Pizza restaurants), and sold his first franchise. Theisen sold the company to Pillsbury in 1985 and stepped down from actively managing the company. In 1986, Pillsbury named Herman Cain CEO and president of the brand. Cain and Ronald B. Gartlan, the company's executive vice president, led a group to purchase the Godfather's brand from Pillsbury, which they did by the beginning of 1990 in a leveraged buyout for what was reported to be $100 million. It was reported to be the fifth largest pizza chain in the United States at the time, down from third place in 1985. About this time, many Godfather's locations in the St. Louis area were bought out by Pantera's Pizza. Under Cain's leadership, Godfather's closed approximately 200 restaurants and eliminated several thousand jobs, and by doing so returned to profitability. Cain stepped down from his position as CEO and president in 1996 and Gartlan became CEO. Cain stayed on as chairman until 2002. In 2009 Gartlan bought out Cain. According to the company's official website, as of August 2016, the chain had 453 locations in the U.S. Godfather's Pizza also operates in some Speedway locations, as well as most Minit Mart locations in Kentucky and northern Tennessee, as of 2007.

Menu
The restaurants serve a wide variety of pizzas, breadsticks, chips, cookies, and pastas. They offer four different types of crust: Original, Golden, Mozza-Loaded, and Thin. By January 2010, the chain introduced gluten-free pizzas, made from rice flour.

Spokesman
Godfather's Pizza is known for its commercials featuring "The Godfather", whose likeness is a parody of Don Fanucci, from the 1974 film The Godfather Part II, though some sources compare the role to that of Don Vito Corleone of 1972's The Godfather. "The Godfather" has been played by two Omaha actors, the first being J. William Koll, who typically wore a white fedora hat, a pin stripe suit, and a flower on his jacket. Dale O'Brien has been the Godfather's Pizza spokesman since about 2000.

See also

 List of buffet restaurants
 List of pizza chains of the United States

References

External links
 Godfather's Pizza

Italian-American culture in Nebraska
Restaurants established in 1973
Pizza chains of the United States
Companies based in Omaha, Nebraska
Restaurants in Omaha, Nebraska
Restaurant chains in the United States
Fast-food chains of the United States
Buffet restaurants
Herman Cain
1973 establishments in Nebraska